Albania participated in the Eurovision Song Contest 2010 in Oslo, Norway, with the song "It's All About You" performed by Juliana Pasha. Its selected entry was chosen through the national selection competition Festivali i Këngës organised by Radio Televizioni Shqiptar (RTSH) in December 2009. Prior to the contest, the song was promoted by a music video and live performances both in Macedonia and the Netherlands.

Albania was drawn to compete in the first semi-final of the Eurovision Song Contest, which took place on 25 May 2010. Performing as number 12, the nation was announced among the top 10 entries of the first semi-final and therefore qualified to compete in the grand final. In the final on 29 May 2010, it performed as number 15 and placed 16th out of the 25 participating countries, scoring 62 points.

Background 

The nation's highest placing in the contest, to this point, had been the seventh place, which it achieved in 2004 with the song "The Image of You" performed by Anjeza Shahini. During its tenure in the contest, Albania failed to qualify for the final two times, with the  entry being the most recent non-qualifier. The nation's national broadcaster, Radio Televizioni Shqiptar (RTSH), has organised Festivali i Këngës since its inauguration in 1962. Since 2003, the winner of the competition has simultaneously won the right to represent Albania in the Eurovision Song Contest.

Before Eurovision

Festivali i Këngës 

RTSH organised the 48th edition of Festivali i Këngës to determine Albania's representative for the Eurovision Song Contest 2010.
The competition consisted of three semi-finals on 24, 25 and 26 December, respectively, and the grand final on 27 December 2009. The four live shows were hosted by Albanian singers Miriam Cani and Alban Skënderaj. After three withdrawals, there were two different categories in Festivali i Këngës, namely the Big Group and the Young Group.

Competing entries 
Key:
 Withdrawn

Shows

Semi-final 1 

The first semi-final of Festivali i Këngës took place on 24 December 2009 and was broadcast live at 20:30 (CET). 18 contestants from the Big Group participated in the first semi-final, with all of them progressing to the grand final.

Semi-final 2 

The second semi-final of Festivali i Këngës took place on 25 December 2009 and was broadcast live at 20:30 (CET). 18 contestants from the Young Group participated in the second semi-final, with the highlighted ones progressing to the grand final.

Semi-final 3 

The third semi-final of Festivali i Këngës took place on 26 December 2009 and was broadcast live at 20:30 (CET). It featured 20 artists, including 18 from the Big Group and two from the Young Group, each performing a duet with an other Albanian artist.

Final 

The grand final of Festivali i Këngës took place on 27 December 2009 and was broadcast live at 20:30 (CET). Determined by the combination of the votes from a seven-member jury, Juliana Pasha emerged as the winner and was simultaneously announced as Albania's representative for the Eurovision Song Contest 2010.

Promotion 

A music video for "It's All About You" premiered via the Eurovision Song Contest's official YouTube channel on 23 March 2010. For promotional purposes, Pasha embarked on a small tour with live performances at various events related to the contest, including in Macedonia and the Netherlands.

At Eurovision 

The Eurovision Song Contest 2010 took place at Telenor Arena in Oslo, Norway, and consisted of two semi-finals held on 25 and 27 May, respectively, and the grand final on 29 May 2010. The EBU split up the competing countries into five different pots based on voting patterns from previous contests, as evaluated by Digame, in order to decrease the influence of neighbour and diaspora voting. On 7 February 2010, an allocation draw was held which placed each country into one of the two semi-finals and determined which half of the show they would perform in. Albania was placed into the first semi-final held on 25 May and was scheduled to perform in the second half of the show. Once all the competing songs for the 2010 contest had been released, the running order for the semi-finals was revealed; Albania was set to perform at position 12, following  and preceding . After qualifying for the final with a sixth place finish in the semi-final, it was announced that Albania would be performing 15th in the final, following  and preceding . At the final, the nation placed 16th out of the 25 competing entries.

Voting 
Voting during the three shows involved each country awarding points from 1-8, 10 and 12 as determined by a combination of 50% national jury and 50% televoting. Each nation's jury consisted of five music industry professionals who are citizens of the country they represent. This jury judged each entry based on: vocal capacity; the stage performance; the song's composition and originality; and the overall impression by the act. In addition, no member of a national jury was permitted to be related in any way to any of the competing acts in such a way that they cannot vote impartially and independently.

The tables below visualise a breakdown of points awarded to Albania in both the first semi-final and the grand final of the Eurovision Song Contest 2010, as well as by the country on both occasions. In the grand final, Albania reached the 16th place, being awarded a total of 62 points, including 12 from North Macedonia and 10 from Greece. The nation awarded its 12 points to North Macedonia in the semi-final and to Greece in the final of the contest.

Points awarded to Albania

Points awarded by Albania

Notes

References 

2010
Countries in the Eurovision Song Contest 2010
2009
Eurovision
Eurovision